Vezzano Ligure (locally ) is a comune (municipality) in the Province of La Spezia in the Italian region of Liguria, located about  southeast of Genoa and about  northeast of La Spezia.

Vezzano Ligure borders the following municipalities: Arcola, Bolano, Follo, La Spezia, Santo Stefano di Magra, Sarzana.

Main sights 

Church of Nostra Signora del Soccorso (18th century)
Romanesque church of Santa Maria Assunta (12th century)
Parish church of San Sebastiano and Santa Maria Assunta (17th century)
Pentagonal tower (13th century)
Remains of the castle of Vezzano Superiore

Economy 

Agriculture includes vines and olive trees with consequent production of grapes, wine and olive oil. Tourism is also active, as well as service companies working for the La Spezia intermodal port.

Transport 

Vezzano Ligure is served by a railway station on the lines Genoa-Rome and Parma-La Spezia located downhill from the center of the old town.

The nearest motorway is the A15 with a marked westbound exit and eastbound entrance between Santo Stefano and La Spezia.

See also
Liguria wine

References

External links
 Official website

Cities and towns in Liguria